The Benson & Hedges Classic is a defunct tennis tournament that was played on the Grand Prix tennis circuit from 1973 to 1974. The event was held in Christchurch, New Zealand at the Cowles Indoor Stadium. This had a wood floor overlain with carpet for tennis events.

Past finals

Singles

Doubles

References

External links
 ATP results archives

Grand Prix tennis circuit
Hard court tennis tournaments
Tennis tournaments in New Zealand
ATP Tour
Defunct tennis tournaments in Oceania
Defunct sports competitions in New Zealand